The first season of iCarly aired on Nickelodeon from September 8, 2007 to July 25, 2008. The season introduces Carly Shay (Miranda Cosgrove), Sam Puckett (Jennette McCurdy), Freddie Benson (Nathan Kress), and Spencer Shay (Jerry Trainor). This is notably the only season without a 1 hour special.

Production
The series was created and executive produced by Dan Schneider, who has created many other shows for the network. The show was produced by Schneider's Bakery and Nickelodeon Productions. The series is filmed at Nickelodeon on Sunset Studios in Hollywood, California. The theme song "Leave It All to Me" written by Michael Corcoran and is performed by Miranda Cosgrove, featuring Drake Bell.

All episodes from this season were originally produced in the 16:9 format, then cropped to 4:3 for broadcast and 16:9 for widescreen release. The season began production in January 2007.

Cast

Main cast

 Miranda Cosgrove as Carly Shay
 Jennette McCurdy as Sam Puckett
 Nathan Kress as Freddie Benson
 Jerry Trainor as Spencer Shay

Recurring cast

Colin Spensor as Wesley
 Noah Munck as Gibby Gibson
 Mary Scheer as Marissa Benson
 Jeremy Rowley as Lewbert
 Mindy Sterling as Ms. Francine Briggs
 David St. James as Mr. Howard
 Tim Russ as Principal Franklin
 Nathan Pearson as Jeremy
 Joseph Buttler as Mr. Stern
 Doug Brochu as Duke
 Reed Alexander as Nevel Papperman
 Greg Mullavy as Grandad Shay
 Christopher David as Rodney Goober

Guest stars
 Austin Butler as Jake ("iLike Jake")
 Christopher Michael as Officer Carl ("iWant More Viewers")
 Nicole Gale Anderson as Tasha ("iNevel")
Charles Kim as Chuck ("iNevel")
 Estelle Harris as Mrs. Halberstadt ("iScream on Halloween")
Carly Bondar as Valerie ("iWill Date Freddie")
 Plain White T's as themselves ("iRue the Day")
Adrian Neil as Mr. Devlin ("iPromise Not to Tell")
 Aria Wallace as Mandy Valdez ("iAm Your Biggest Fan")
Aaron Albert as Jonah ("iHate Sam's Boyfriend")
 Randall Park as Mr. Palladino ("iGot Detention")
Asante Jones as Detective Tragg ("iStakeout")
 Ryan Bollman as Spanky Stimbler ("iStakeout")
Wyatt Carper as Spanky's son ("iStakeout")
 Shayne Topp as Philip Brownley ("iMight Switch Schools")
 Leon Thomas III as Harper ("iCarly Saves TV")
 Sammi Hanratty as Morgan Brenner ("iCarly Saves TV")
 Rachel G. Fox as Amber Tate ("iCarly Saves TV")
 David Starzyk as Brad Brenner ("iCarly Saves TV")
 Jessica Makinson as Miss Lauren Ackerman ("iHave a Lovesick Teacher")

Episodes

References

2007 American television seasons
2008 American television seasons
1